Yannick Stopyra (born 9 January 1961) is a French former footballer who played as a striker.

He amassed Ligue 1 totals of 455 matches and 130 goals in representation of six teams, mainly Sochaux and Toulouse, in a 17-year professional career.

Stopyra appeared for France at the 1986 World Cup.

Club career
Born in Troyes, Aube of Polish ancestry, Stopyra spent 15 of his 17 seasons as a professional in Ligue 1, representing FC Sochaux-Montbéliard, Stade Rennais FC, Toulouse FC, FC Girondins de Bordeaux, AS Cannes and FC Metz. He made his senior debut with the former at only 17, helping it to the second position in the domestic championship in 1979–80 and the semi-finals of the UEFA Cup the following campaign.

Stopyra retired in June 1994 at the age of 33, after two years in Ligue 2 with FC Mulhouse. He later returned to Bordeaux, going on to work with its youth sides.

International career
Stopyra won his first cap for the France national team on 27 February 1980, in a friendly with Greece where he scored the final 5–1. He appeared in a further 32 internationals and netted 11 goals over eight years.

Stopyra was picked by manager Henri Michel for the squad that competed at the 1986 FIFA World Cup. He appeared in all the games but one in Mexico as Les Bleus finished in third position, scoring against Hungary in the group stage (3–0) and against Italy in the round of 16 (2–0).

International goals

Personal life
Stopyra's father, Julien (1933–2015), was also a forward. He earned one cap for France.

Honours
France
FIFA World Cup third place: 1986
Artemio Franchi Cup: 1985

References

External links

1961 births
Living people
People from Redon, Ille-et-Vilaine
French people of Polish descent
Sportspeople from Ille-et-Vilaine
Sportspeople from Troyes
French footballers
Footballers from Brittany
Footballers from Grand Est
Association football forwards
Ligue 1 players
Ligue 2 players
FC Sochaux-Montbéliard players
Stade Rennais F.C. players
Toulouse FC players
FC Girondins de Bordeaux players
AS Cannes players
FC Metz players
FC Mulhouse players
France international footballers
1986 FIFA World Cup players